The Atoka Independent School District is a school district based in Atoka, Oklahoma, United States. It contains one elementary school (Atoka Elementary School), one middle school (McCall Middle School), and one high school (Atoka High School).

See also
 List of school districts in Oklahoma

References

External links
 Atoka Public Schools website
 Atoka Overview

School districts in Oklahoma
Education in Atoka County, Oklahoma